Xestobium is a genus of death-watch and spider beetles in the family Ptinidae. There are about 13 described species in Xestobium.

Species
These 14 species belong to the genus Xestobium:

 Xestobium abietis Fisher, 1947 i c g
 Xestobium affine LeConte, 1874 i c g b
 Xestobium africanum Español, 1964 g
 Xestobium austriacum Reitter, 1890 g
 Xestobium caucasicum Logvinovskiy, 1977 g
 Xestobium declive
 Xestobium filicorne Israelson, 1974 g
 Xestobium gaspensis White, 1975 i c g
 Xestobium impressum (Wollaston, 1865) g
 Xestobium marginicolle (LeConte, 1859) i c g
 Xestobium parvum White, 1976 i c g
 Xestobium plumbeum (Illiger, 1801) g
 Xestobium rufovillosum (De Geer, 1774) i c g b (deathwatch beetle)
 Xestobium subincanum Reitter, 1878 g

Data sources: i = ITIS, c = Catalogue of Life, g = GBIF, b = Bugguide.net

Gallery

References

Ptinidae